The 2017–18 season of Romania's top level women's football league was again called Liga I, after four seasons in which it was named Superliga. It is the 28th season of top level football and will decide the Romanian champions and UEFA Women's Champions League participant.

Olimpia Cluj won the title.

Team changes

To Liga I
Promoted from Liga II
 Universitatea Alexandria
 Fortuna Becicherecu Mic

From Liga I
Relegated to Liga II
 Navobi Iași
 Independența Baia Mare

Stadiums by capacity and location

League table

Season results

Season positions by round

References

External links
 fotbalfeminin.net 

Rom
Fem
Romanian Superliga (women's football) seasons